Small Factory was an American indie rock band formed in 1991 and based in Providence, Rhode Island, United States. The group was well regarded as an exemplar of 1990s indie rock although they never achieved great success or influence. Especially noted for the exuberance and charming banter of their live shows.  The band broke up in 1995, and Dave Auchenbach formed Flora Street, while the other two members continued working together as The Godrays. Phoebe Summersquash later voiced a character on the TV series Downtown, and in 2005 appeared in Sarah Silverman's film "Jesus Is Magic." Alex Kemp moved to Chicago and formed the band Assassins with Joe Cassidy, Aaron Miller, Merritt Lear and David Golitko. After signing with the major label Arista, the album was subsequently never released as the label's president L.A. Reid was fired and the holding company, BMG, briefly closed the company.

Auchenbach later engineered for the seminal Providence noise rock band Lightning Bolt.

The Band played a short series of re-union concerts in New York and Providence in April 2012.

Members
Alex Kemp - bass, vocals
Dave Auchenbach - guitar, vocals
Phoebe Summersquash - drums, vocals

Discography

LPs
The Industrial Evolution (1991 - Pop Narcotic)
I Do Not Love You (1993 - spinART)
For If You Cannot Fly (1994 - Vernon Yard)

Singles
 Suggestions (1991 - 7") 
 What To Want (1992 - 7") 
 August (1993 - split with Tsunami - If You Hurt Me" Simple Machines (appeared later on Working Holiday! (1994)) 
 So What About Love (1993 - 7") 
 Lose Your Way (1994 - 7") 
 The Last Time That We Talked (1994 - 7")

Appearances
 ...One Last Kiss (1992 - "Hey Lucille") 
 Something Pretty Beautiful (1993 - "Hopefully") 
 Why Do You Think They Call It Pop - The Pop Narcotic Compilation (1994 - "Yeah")

Compilations
Industrial Evolution (1996) Pop Narcotic (compilation of singles and miscellany)

References

External links
[ Allmusic.com entry]
Trouser Press entry

Indie rock musical groups from Rhode Island
Musical groups established in 1991
Musical groups from Rhode Island
1991 establishments in Rhode Island
SpinART Records artists
Slumberland Records artists